General elections were due to be held in Samoa on 21 May 2021. They were called by O le Ao o le Malo (Head of state) Tuimalealiʻifano Vaʻaletoʻa Sualauvi II following the inconclusive results of the April 2021 election, but before the new parliament had even been convened or numerous electoral court petitions settled.

The decision to call new elections was overturned by the Supreme Court on 17 May 2021 and the results of the April election restored.

Background

The April 2021 elections resulted in a hung Parliament, with the HRPP and FAST each tied on 25 seats, with independent Tuala Iosefo Ponifasio holding the balance of power. Ponifasio later joined the FAST Party, but in the interim the Samoan Electoral Commission controversially declared the HRPP's Ali'imalemanu Alofa Tuuau elected due to the requirement that a minimum of 10% of seats in parliament must be held by women, creating a 26–26 tie. The decision was immediately challenged in court. 28 election petitions, 14 against FAST and 14 against the HRPP, were also filed, with hearings beginning from 4 May.

Before any of the court cases could be resolved, O le Ao o le Malo Tuimalealiʻifano Vaʻaletoʻa Sualauvi II, acting on the advice of caretaker Prime Minister Tuila'epa Sa'ilele Malielegaoi, purportedly dissolved Parliament and called new elections for 21 May. FAST Party leader Fiamē Naomi Mataafa denounced the calling of new elections, saying that it had been done to pre-empt the decision of the Supreme Court and that it was "wrong and unlawful [and] also threatens and undermines the rule of law".

A writ for the new election was issued on 5 May 2021. Candidates were carried over from the April election, and no new candidates were allowed to stand. The last date for candidates to withdraw was 7 May, and early voting was due to be held on 19 May.

On 17 May 2022, three additional female members were sworn in to fulfil the parliamentary requirement that at least 10% of MPs are women. Two of the additional members were members of the HRPP whilst the other was a member of FAST.

Following a formal complaint by deputy prime minister Tuala Iosefo Ponifasio, Tuila'epa, along with HRPP secretary Lealailepule Rimoni Aiafi, were permanently suspended from parliament on 24 May 2022 after the ethics and privileges committee found both individuals in contempt of parliament relating to their roles in the 2021 constitutional crisis.

Electoral system
The 2026 elections will see 51 members of the Fono elected from single-member constituencies. Universal suffrage was introduced in 1990, permitting Samoan citizens over the age of 21 to vote in person. Candidates were required to be at least 21 years of age, heads of their families and resident of the country for at least three years prior the nomination date. Civil servants and people with mental illness were ineligible to stand as candidates. People convicted for bribery or an electoral offense, and people given a prison sentence of more than two years (including the death sentence), were also ineligible.

The Constitution Amendment Act 2013 ensures a minimum of 10 per cent or 5 in number of seats in parliament are reserved for women.

Campaign
The HRPP began campaigning on 5 May, arguing that the re-election was necessary to pass a budget and ensure that public servants could be paid. The HRPP proposed banning access to Facebook and other social media for the campaign to prevent "disrespectful, repulsive and obscene language towards our leaders", claiming it was a matter of "national security".

The Tautua Samoa party began its campaign on 7 May, alleging that the April elections were marred by bribery.

42 candidates withdrew by the 7 May deadline, 39 of them from the HRPP, which had fielded multiple candidates in some constituencies in the April elections.  As a result Fa’asaleleaga No. 5 MP Peseta Vaifou Tevagaena will be elected unopposed.

On 13 May HRPP candidate Tavu'i Asiata Tiafau announced that if the election took place, he would run under the HRPP banner but vote with FAST if elected.

References

Samoa
2026